Acron Group is a global Russian mineral fertilizer producer.

History
At the core of the Group are two production facilities, Acron (established in 1961) and Dorogobuzh (established in 1965), which at one time formed the basis of the Soviet fertiliser industry. After the collapse of the Soviet Union, both enterprises were privatised, underwent a large-scale revamping and adopted the long-term reconstruction and upgrade programme and consolidated corporate governance system.

The company in its current form exists since 2002, when Acron developed a vertically integrated business. In addition to its production assets, the Group has its own logistics and distribution networks and is investing in raw material projects. In order to strengthen its position in the world's largest fertiliser market – China – in 2005 the Group acquired complex fertiliser producer Hongri Acron and created its own extensive distribution network. In August 2016 Hongri Acron plant was sold to a Hong Kong industrial and investment company. In 2011 the company entered a joint venture with Rio Tinto to develop the Albany potash prospect in Saskatchewan, Canada.

Owners and Executives

As of April 2021, Redbrick Investments S.a.r.l. holds 30.98 percent of authorised capital, Acron Group 55.00 percent, Dorogobuzh holds 8.09% and the National Settlement Depository holds 3.54% stake.

Vladimir Kunitsky has been the Chairman of the Managing Board and CEO since 29 July 2011. Vladimir Gavrikov was executive director in 2005–2011; he is still a member of the board of directors and also a deputy of the duma (parliament) of Novgorod Oblast.

Chairman of the Board of Directors is Alexander Popov.

The Group's ultimate parent is Terasta Enterprises Limited. The Group is ultimately controlled by Viatcheslav Kantor.

Operations
Acron is a global mineral fertiliser producer of complex fertilisers such as NPK and bulk blends, and nitrogen fertilisers such as urea, ammonium nitrate and urea-ammonium nitrate. The Group's key markets are Russia, Brazil, Europe and the United States.Acron has two production facilities – Acron (Veliky Novgorod, Russia) and Dorogobuzh (Smolensk Region, Russia). Acron's logistics and transportation capabilities include its own fleet of railway cars and three sea port trans-shipment facilities on the Baltic Sea – at the Kaliningrad port of Russia, at the Estonian Sillamäe port and at the Estonian Muuga port. The Group operates distribution networks in Russia and China. Acron employs over 11,000 people. North-Western Phosphorus Company (NWPC) was established by Acron in 2005 to secure an independent phosphate raw material base. On 24 October 2006 NWPC obtained state licences to develop apatite-nepheline ore deposits at the Oleniy Ruchey and Partomchorr fields in the Murmansk region.

Verkhnekamsk Potash Company (VPC) implements a project to create a potash raw material base for Acron Group. In 2008, Acron Group obtained a licence to develop the Talitsky area of the Verkhnekamsk potassium-magnesium salt deposit (VPMSD) with sylvinite reserves (categories А+В+С1) of 681.5 mn t. The deposit development is expected to start in 2018. However, construction was ongoing as of June 2019, and with a new $1.7 billion financing agreement concluded between Acron and PAO Sberbank, Gazprombank and Vnesheconombank to accelerate construction, production is set to begin "at the end of 2022 or the beginning of 2023."

In June 2014 the company described the Albany potash project which it develops with Rio Tinto as "one of the best potash development opportunities in the world."

Subsidiaries 
Acron USA Inc. was founded by Acron in 2008 to handle marketing, distribution and sea transportation of the Group's export cargos. Acron Switzerland AG was set up in 2009 to supply the Group's products to the European market. At the end of 2017, Acron Group established a distribution company in France, Acron France SAS. In 2018, Acron Group set up its distribution companies Acron Brasil Ltda. in Brazil and Acron Argentina S.R.L. in Argentina. The Group is currently developing its own distribution network in China, called Yong Sheng Feng. Yong Sheng Feng's key business is wholesaling fertilisers and other chemicals.

Financial results
In 2020, the Group's output of ammonia and mineral fertilisers (exclusive of own use) totaled 8,0 million tonnes.
In 2020 the Group's consolidated revenues under IFRS were RUB 119,864 billion (US$1.8 billion), and net profit was RUB 3,836 billion (US$53 million).

Sales
The Group sells its products both via retailers and directly to end users. The Group established its own distribution network under the Agronova brand in 2005 to improve the efficiency of its domestic sales. Agronova comprises 10 specialised agrochemical companies, which allow direct access to product consumers in major farming regions of the country. The total storage capacity of the distribution network is 189,000 tonnes.

References

External links
Acron official website
IFA member companies
Acron is the new Russian fertilizer play as world potash prices soar. Retrieved on 13 August 2008.
Acron to reduce listing after commodity decline. Retrieved on 13 August 2008.

Sources
Acron's prospectus for the purposes of Directive 2003/71/EC as of 6 August 2008

Companies based in Veliky Novgorod
Fertilizer companies of Russia
Companies listed on the Moscow Exchange
Chemical companies established in 1961
1961 establishments in the Soviet Union
Articles which contain graphical timelines
Russian brands
Multinational companies headquartered in Russia
Chemical companies of the Soviet Union